The 2022 Le Castellet FIA Formula 2 round was a motor racing event held between 22 and 24 July 2022 at the Circuit Paul Ricard, Le Castellet, France. It was the ninth round of the 2022 FIA Formula 2 Championship and was held in support of the 2022 French Grand Prix.

Driver changes 
David Beckmann replaced Jake Hughes for the Le Castellet round at Van Amersfoort Racing after Hughes tested positive for COVID-19.

Classification

Qualifying
Logan Sargeant took his second pole position of the season, beating out DAMS driver Ayumu Iwasa by only 0.006 seconds. Frederik Vesti qualified in P3 for the Feature Race right ahead of championship leader Felipe Drugovich, who later was demoted to sixth after his fastest lap time was deleted due to exceeding track limits. 

Notes:
 – Roy Nissany originally qualified twentieth, but will be starting the Sprint Race from the back of the grid due to both re-joining the track in a dangerous manner and impeding Olli Caldwell at Free Practice.

Sprint race 

Notes:
 – Théo Pourchaire and Jüri Vips originally finished third and sixth respectively, but were later given a five-second time-penalty for both forcing Marcus Armstrong off the track.
 – Marcus Armstrong originally finished ninth, but was later given a five-second time-penalty for causing a collision with Jehan Daruvala.

Feature race 

Notes:
 – Enzo Fittipaldi received a five-place grid drop for causing a collision with Roberto Merhi in the Sprint Race, demoting him to nineteenth on the grid for the Feature Race.
 – Richard Verschoor retired from the race, but was classified as he completed over 90% of the race distance.

Standings after the event 

Drivers' Championship standings

Teams' Championship standings

 Note: Only the top five positions are included for both sets of standings.

See also 
 2022 French Grand Prix

References

External links 
 Official website

|- style="text-align:center"
|width="35%"|Previous race:
|width="30%"|FIA Formula 2 Championship2022 season
|width="40%"|Next race:

Le Castellet
Le Castellet
Le Castellet